Amphibamiformes is an unranked clade with Dissorophoidea created by Schoch (2018). It encompasses all of the taxa traditionally considered to be "amphibamids" (subsequently restricted to Doleserpeton annectens and Amphibamus grandiceps by Schoch), branchiosaurids, and hypothetically lissamphibians under the traditional temnospondyl hypothesis of lissamphibian origins. These taxa are typically small-bodied dissorophoids and form the sister group to Olsoniformes, which comprises dissorophids and trematopids.

Diagnosis 
(1) Palatine and ectopterygoid reduced to narrow struts; (2) interpterygoid vacuity greatly expanded laterally; (3) humerus length:waist ratio of 6:10; (4) basioccipital and supraoccipital absent.

Definition 
The most inclusive clade containing Amphibamus grandiceps but not Dissorophus multicinctus.

Phylogeny 
Simplified phylogeny of Dissorophoidea from Schoch (2018):

The phylogeny of Amphibamiformes has historically been relatively unresolved. Below are earlier analyses that recover slightly different topologies (nomenclature adjusted to reflect current status and ranks):

Fröbisch & Reisz (2008)

Anderson et al. (2008)

Gallery

References 

Dissorophoids
Carboniferous temnospondyls
Permian temnospondyls
Triassic temnospondyls